Suada and Olga Bridge (Bosnian, Croatian and Serbian: Most Suade i Olge / Мост Суаде и Олге), also known by its old name Vrbanja Bridge (Vrbanja most / Врбања мост) is a bridge across the Miljacka river in Sarajevo.

Name 

The oldest name of this bridge is Ćirišhana bridge, named after Turkish word for glue factory, which was located near the bridge on right side of the river. During Yugoslavian-era, name of the bridge was "Vrbanja bridge", and on 6 April 1996 it was renamed first to "Suada Dilberović bridge", after which on 3 December 1999 it was renamed to today's name "Suada and Olga bridge". It is named after Suada Dilberović and Olga Sučić, the first victims shot by Bosnian Serb's Democratic Party militia at the beginning of the Siege of Sarajevo, while a group of civilians was peacefully demonstrating.

History 

On 19 May 1993, the couple Admira Ismić and Boško Brkić, a Bosniak and a Bosnian Serb, were also shot while trying to cross the bridge, which was the subject of the 1994 documentary Romeo and Juliet in Sarajevo, inspired by a piece of Kurt Schork. In 1995 it was the site of the battle of Vrbanja Bridge between French Troupes de Marine of the United Nations Protection Force and militiamen from the Army of Republika Srpska.

In popular culture 
Up with People - sang the song "Last Embrace", inspired by Bosko and Admira's story as part of their show The Festival
Bill Madden - "Bosko and Admira", from the 2008 album Child of the Same God
Jill Sobule - "Vrbana Bridge"
"薩拉熱窩的羅密歐與茱麗葉", exact translation in Chinese of "Romeo and Juliet in Sarajevo", from Sammi Cheng's 1994 album Ten Commandments

Notes

External links

Bridges in Sarajevo
Siege of Sarajevo